Penelope Stone (born August 11, 1962 in Houston) is an American former handball player who competed in the 1984 Summer Olympics and in the 1988 Summer Olympics.

References

1962 births
Living people
Sportspeople from Houston
American female handball players
Olympic handball players of the United States
Handball players at the 1984 Summer Olympics
Handball players at the 1988 Summer Olympics
21st-century American women